Lior Carmi (sometimes listed as Lior Karmi; ; born November 1, 1975 in Kibutz Massada) is an Israeli sprint canoer who competed from the mid-1990s to the mid-2000s (decade). She won a bronze medal in the K-1 1000 m event at the 2003 ICF Canoe Sprint World Championships in Gainesville.

Carmi also competed in two Summer Olympics. At the 1996 Summer Olympics in Atlanta, she was eliminated in the semifinals of the K-1 500 m event. Four years later in Sydney, Carmi was eliminated in the semifinals of the K-2 500 m event.

Carmi studied astrophysics and planetary science in Tel-Aviv university, she lives with her family in Ramat Gan and owns a construction company.

References

External links
 

1975 births
Canoeists at the 1996 Summer Olympics
Canoeists at the 2000 Summer Olympics
Israeli female canoeists
Living people
Olympic canoeists of Israel
ICF Canoe Sprint World Championships medalists in kayak
Tel Aviv University alumni